Tsypnavolok or Tsyp-Navolok is a rural locality (an inhabited locality) in Pechengsky District of Murmansk Oblast, Russia, located on the Rybachy Peninsula by Cape Tsypnavolok, by the Barents Sea.

History
During the 1860s, the Murmansk coast of the Kola Peninsula was actively being settled.  In 1867, a fishing village was established near Cape Tsypnavolok by Kola Norwegians (immigrants from Norway). In 1929, 114 ethnic Norwegians were registered in the area, and therefore in 1930 an ethnic Norwegian rural council (selsoviet) was established. In 1940, the Norwegians were transferred during the ethnic cleansing campaigns near the border, and the selsoviet was abolished. 

After World War II, the Norwegians were allowed to return to Murmansk Oblast, but they were to be settled in Port-Vladimir on Shalim Island in Kolsky District. (A naval base was later established there, civilians were evacuated in 1969 (the village was legally dissolved in 2008), and the base was closed and abandoned around 1994.)

Modern times
As of 2009, Tsypnavolok hosted a military unit, a weather station, and a lighthouse.

Accumulations of sulfide (chalcopyrite, galena, pyrite, sphalerite) nodules in turbidites are found in the area.

References

Notes

Sources

Rural localities in Murmansk Oblast